Slope mining is a method of accessing valuable geological material, such as coal or ore.  A sloping access shaft travels downwards towards desired material.  Slope mines differ from shaft and drift mines, which access resources by tunneling straight down or horizontally, respectively.  In slope mining, the primary access to the mine is on an incline.  Mine hoists may still be used to raise and lower loads on the incline if it is steep, but on shallower slopes, conveyor belts, locomotives or trucks may do the work.  Drainage and ventilation of slope mines may be done using the primary slope, or it may be done using auxiliary shafts or bore-holes.

See also
2010 Copiapo mining accident
San Jose Mine

References

Underground mining